The 2000 Guineas Stakes is a Group 1 flat race in Great Britain open to three-year-old thoroughbred colts and fillies. It is run on the Rowley Mile at Newmarket over a distance of 1 mile (1,609 metres) and scheduled to take place each year at the start of May.

|}

It is one of Britain's five Classic races, and at present it is the first to be run in the year. It also serves as the opening leg of the Triple Crown, followed by the Derby and the St Leger, although the feat of winning all three has been rarely attempted in recent decades.

History
The 2000 Guineas Stakes was first run on 18 April 1809, and it preceded the introduction of a version for fillies only, the 1000 Guineas Stakes, by five years. Both races were established by the Jockey Club under the direction of Sir Charles Bunbury, who had earlier co-founded the Derby at Epsom. The races were named according to their original prize funds (a guinea amounted to 21 shillings, or £1.05).

By the mid-1860s, the 2000 Guineas was regarded as one of Britain's most prestigious races for three-year-olds. The five leading events for this age group, characterised by increasing distances as the season progressed, began to be known as "Classics". The concept was later adopted in many other countries.

European variations of the 2000 Guineas include the Irish 2,000 Guineas, the Mehl-Mülhens-Rennen, the Poule d'Essai des Poulains and the Premio Parioli. Elsewhere, variations include the Australian Guineas and the Satsuki Shō.

The 2000 Guineas is served by trial races such as the Craven Stakes and the Greenham Stakes, but for some horses it is the first race of the season. The 2000 Guineas itself can act as a trial for the Derby, and the last horse to win both was Camelot in 2012. The most recent 2000 Guineas participant to win the Derby was Masar, placed third in 2018.

Since 2001, the 2000 Guineas and the 1000 Guineas Stakes have offered equal prize money. Each had a purse of £523,750 in 2019.

Records
Leading jockey (9 wins):
 Jem Robinson – Enamel (1825), Cadland (1828), Riddlesworth (1831), Clearwell (1833), Glencoe (1834), Ibrahim (1835), Bay Middleton (1836), Conyngham (1847), Flatcatcher (1848)

Leading trainer (10 wins) :
 Aidan O'Brien – King of Kings (1998), Rock of Gibraltar (2002), Footstepsinthesand (2005), George Washington (2006), Henrythenavigator (2008), Camelot (2012), Gleneagles (2015), Churchill (2017), Saxon Warrior (2018), Magna Grecia (2019)

Leading owner (11 wins): (includes part ownership)
 Sue Magnier – Entrepreneur (1997), King of Kings (1998), Rock of Gibraltar (2002), Footstepsinthesand (2005), George Washington (2006), Henrythenavigator (2008), Camelot (2012), Gleneagles (2015), Churchill (2017), Saxon Warrior (2018), Magna Grecia (2019)
 Fastest winning time – Kameko (2020), 1m 34.72s
 Widest winning margin (since 1900) – Tudor Minstrel (1947), 8 lengths
 Longest odds winner – Rockavon (1961), 66/1
 Shortest odds winner – St Frusquin (1896), 12/100
 Most runners – 28, in 1930
 Fewest runners – 2, in 1829 and 1830

Winners

† designates a Triple Crown Winner.‡ designates a filly.

See also
 Horse racing in Great Britain
 List of British flat horse races

References

 Paris-Turf:
 Racing Post:

 galopp-sieger.de – 2000 Guineas Stakes.
 horseracinghistory.co.uk  – 2000 Guineas.
 ifhaonline.org – International Federation of Horseracing Authorities – Two Thousand Guineas (2019).
 tbheritage.com – Two Thousand Guineas Stakes.
 
 
 YouTube Race Video https://www.youtube.com/playlist?list=PLfn5x2SD03q5hUzcSt8X4o8iklgqjrQut

External links

 
Flat races in Great Britain
Newmarket Racecourse
Flat horse races for three-year-olds
Triple Crown of Thoroughbred Racing
Recurring sporting events established in 1809
1809 establishments in England
British Champions Series